Heinrich Scherer (born 19 January 1938) is a Swiss rower. He competed in the men's coxless pair event at the 1960 Summer Olympics.

References

1938 births
Living people
Swiss male rowers
Olympic rowers of Switzerland
Rowers at the 1960 Summer Olympics
Sportspeople from Bern